Dolores Cordero Gómez (born 1 April 1973), better known as Lola Cordero, is a Spanish journalist and actress who lives in Argentina.

Biography
Dolores Cordero Gómez was born in Barcelona. At age 12 she moved to Seville, where her parents lived. At age 22 she went to live alone in Madrid. There she studied social work and acting. She was an actress and director of plays. She was the manager of a theater production company that put on The Vagina Monologues.

In 2001, she met her current husband, entertainment journalist , through friends while studying at the Cinema Institute in Barcelona. Eight months later they were married in Buenos Aires. Alexis has a daughter, Victoria, from a previous relationship.

In Argentina, Cordero first worked for EWTN, the Catholic channel of the United States. She was casting director for a translation of the rosary which was filmed in the Holy Land. She performed Spanish-language dubbing for Internet courses and lent her voice to the role of Queen Isabella during the 2004  which was held in Rosario.

In 2005, she met the Argentine entertainment journalist Beto Casella, who invited her to take part in his radio show Bien levantado as a panelist. She is still on the entertainment and news program.

In 2007 and 2008, she worked on the debate portion of Gran Hermano (Argentina's edition of Big Brother).

In August 2008, Cordero gave birth to her first daughter, Lara. Her godparents are journalist  (chosen by Alexis, his co-worker) and Carmela Bárbaro, whom Lola met on Bien levantado.

From 2008 to 2010, Cordero worked on Intrusos en el espectáculo, ending when she became pregnant and decided to temporarily retire from the show.

In 2009, she got her first role as a presenter on Telefe's Alguien a quien querer, a program where she was assisting one person and there were three women or men pre-selected, so that the person finally had the chance to meet and choose one of them.

In January 2011, her second daughter, Eva, was born. The girl's godparents are presenter , whom Lola met on Gran Hermano, and journalist .

Cordero currently works as a panelist on the daily program Bendita, hosted by Beto Casella. She joined it in 2012.

Since 2014, she has worked as an announcer and journalist from 6:00 am to 9:00 am on Radio 10's Levantado de 10, together with Beto Casella.

Television

Radio

References

External links
 
 
 Page at Alternativa Teatral

1973 births
Actresses from Barcelona
Living people
Spanish expatriates in Argentina
Spanish journalists
Spanish women journalists